The 49ers–Giants rivalry is an American football rivalry between the San Francisco 49ers and the New York Giants. It is one of the great inter-division rivalry games in the National Football League (NFL). The two teams do not play every year; instead, they play once every three years due to the NFL's rotating division schedules, or if the two teams finish in the same place in their respective divisions, they would play the ensuing season. Since 1982, the 49ers and Giants have met eight times in the postseason (including two NFC Championship Games), tied for the most times two teams have met in the playoffs in the NFL since that time (with 49ers–Packers being the other).

The Giants have won 17 regular season games while the 49ers have also won 17 and both have won 4 postseason games against each other.  However, San Francisco leads the overall series 19–12 since 1980. CBS Sports ranked this rivalry as the No. 1 NFL rivalry of the 1980s.

Memorable games

1981 Divisional Playoff Game: Seeds of a Dynasty

In what was both Bill Walsh and Joe Montana's third season with the San Francisco 49ers the Team finished 13-3 after starting the season 1–2. Clinching the NFC West with a week 13 matchup with the New York Giants and would later finish as the #1 seed in the NFC. Four weeks later the Giants and 49ers met again in the Divisional Round and San Francisco prevailed with a 38–24 victory en route to winning Super Bowl XVI.

1984 Divisional Playoff Game: Second Win in 4 Years

The 49ers finished the 1984 season with a record of 15–1. The Niners hosted the Giants for the second time in four seasons in Candlestick Park. A defensive struggle between both teams the 49ers prevailed 21–10 against a young emerging Big Blue Wrecking Crew defense en route to their second Lombardi trophy in Super Bowl XIX.

1985 Wild Card Playoff Game: Winds of Change

Entering the 1985 playoffs the 49ers were unable to top their 15–1 record and fell to 10–6 and finishing the season as a Wild Card hoping to repeat as Super Bowl Champions. They would travel to the Meadowlands and face a familiar foe: the New York Giants for the first time in the postseason at Giants Stadium. Despite 362 yards of total offense by the 49ers, they were held to a field goal as the home team prevailed 17-3 and would start a 3-game losing streak in the postseason against the Giants.

1986 Divisional Playoff Game:  The Massacre in the Meadowlands

Having gone 14–2 during the regular season and riding a nine-game winning streak, the Giants faced off against the Niners in a divisional playoff game at Giants Stadium in the Meadowlands following the 1986 season.  The game featured at least five future Hall of Fame players (QB Joe Montana, WR Jerry Rice and S Ronnie Lott for the Niners & LB Lawrence Taylor and LB Harry Carson for the Giants), and several future Hall of Fame coaches (Bill Walsh for San Francisco & Bill Parcells and Bill Belichick for New York).  San Francisco looked to be on its way to an early lead when Jerry Rice turned a short pass into a long gain, but then inexplicably dropped the football while running after the catch.  The fumble was recovered by the Giants, who went on to take a 28–3 lead at halftime.  The game was also notable by the vicious hit on Joe Montana by Giants nose tackle Jim Burt of the Giants. The final score was Giants 49, Niners 3.  The Giants went on to win Super Bowl XXI that year.

1990 NFC Championship Game: "There Will be No Three-Peat"

Having won two straight Super Bowls behind quarterback Joe Montana in 1988 and 1989, the 49ers appeared poised to do it again and make NFL history to become the first team to three-peat in the Super Bowl era as they hosted the Giants in the NFC Championship Game. San Francisco was the heavy favorite, but the Giants played inspired football, holding their own with the two-time defending Super Bowl champions. The game turned into a defensive struggle and a battle for field position. One of the more memorable moments in the game is Joe Montana being knocked out on a blindside hit by Giants defensive end Leonard Marshall as Montana backed into Marshall's oncoming pass rush while trying to evade Giants linebacker Lawrence Taylor rushing from Montana's right.  This contest would be Montana's second to last game as a 49er. New York trailed 13–12 with 49ers quarterback Steve Young in relief of Montana and trying to run out the clock when the 49ers fell prey to the relentlessness of the Giants' defense.  Giants nose tackle Erik Howard turned his shoulders perpendicular to the line of scrimmage in order to negate a double-team block by 49ers' guard Guy McIntyre and center Jesse Sapolu.  McIntyre released from his block on Erik Howard to check the oncoming rush of Giants linebacker Pepper Johnson allowing Howard to knife through as Jesse Sapolu knocked him to the ground and Howard managed to get his helmet on the football when he came into contact with 49ers running back Roger Craig forcing Craig to fumble the ball.  On the right-side of the Giants defensive formation, Giants linebacker Lawrence Taylor beat a block by tight end Brent Jones and another subsequent block by fullback Tom Rathman to position himself in the offensive backfield behind Craig's location in the 49er-Giant scrum at the line of scrimmage.  Taylor caught the ball as it was knocked out of Craig's grasp and was tackled by Tom Rathman and Brent Jones, the 49er players he beat to get into position to recover the fumble forced by Erik Howard, with less than 3 minutes in the game. The Giants drove downfield and with four seconds, they turned to placekicker Matt Bahr who stepped onto the field to attempt a 42-yard field goal that win the game for the Giants. Bahr successfully executed the kick, sending the Giants to Super Bowl XXV, which they would win over the Buffalo Bills. The game is most notable for play-by-play announcer Pat Summerall's quote "there will be no three-peat" after Bahr made the field goal. The NFL in its 100 Greatest game series named it the 25th greatest game of all time

1993 NFC Divisional Playoff: Ricky runs wild

49ers running back Ricky Watters ran for 118 yards and a playoff record 5 touchdowns as the 49ers crush the Giants 44–3 to advance to the NFC Championship Game where they would lose to the eventual Super Bowl champion Dallas Cowboys. The 49ers dominated the entire game as they outgained the Giants 413 yards to 194 yards, with the defense sacking Giants quarterback Phil Simms 4 times, and forcing 3 turnovers. This game also marked the final game of the careers of Simms and linebacker Lawrence Taylor as they announced their retirement soon after.

2002: Cortez kicks game winner

The Giants totally dominated the 2002 regular season contest in the Meadowlands, played on national television the Thursday before the first weekend. New York outgained San Francisco 361–279, but also turned it over three times while only forcing one. The game was tied, 13–13 when Tiki Barber scored on a 1-yard touchdown run with 1:55 remaining. But Jeff Garcia led the 49ers down the field to the Giants' 19 yard line, where Jose Cortez connected on a 36-yard field goal with six seconds left to give the 49ers a dramatic 16–13 victory.

2002 NFC Wild Card: The Comeback

For the second time in the 2002 season, the Giants and 49ers played in San Francisco. This time, however, it was a Wild Card playoff game. The Giants once again dominated the game from the get go, racing out to a 38–14 lead late in the third quarter. But Jeff Garcia once again led the 49ers back, this time in one of the most incredible comebacks in football history. He rallied San Francisco to three touchdown drives (and a two-point conversion on one of them) and a field goal for 25 unanswered points to give the 49ers a 39–38 lead with a minute to go. But the Giants had one more chance. QB Kerry Collins drove the Giants down to San Francisco's 23 yard line, where they set up for the game-winning field goal with six seconds left. But the snap from Trey Junkin was too low, and holder Matt Allen was forced to scramble and heave a desperation last gasp pass, which fell incomplete, and the 49ers won, 39–38. The 24 point deficit erased by the 49ers was the second largest deficit ever overcome in a playoff game.

In a rare move, the day after the game the NFL issued a formal written apology to the Giants for a bad call by the referees on the final play of the game.  The referees, the league ruled, had missed a blatant pass interference penalty against San Francisco that would have nullified another penalty on the Giants, thereby giving the Giants another chance to kick a 41-yard game-winning FG.  But the result of the game stood.

2011 NFC Championship: Tynes kicks Giants to Super Bowl

After the 49ers defeated the Giants in Candlestick Park in the regular season, the two teams met again in the NFC Championship Game in San Francisco. The 49ers struck immediately, with Alex Smith connecting with Vernon Davis for a 73-yard touchdown to put the 49ers up 7–0. But Eli Manning responded with a touchdown of his own, to Bear Pascoe, and then Lawrence Tynes kicked a field goal to give New York a 10–7 halftime lead. Smith answered with another touchdown to Davis to put the 49ers up 14–10, and Manning answered with a touchdown to Mario Manningham to put the Giants up 17–14. David Akers then hit a 25-yard field goal to force overtime. In the OT session, 49ers punt returner Kyle Williams was stripped of the football by Giants linebacker Jacquian Williams on a punt return. New York recovered, and Lawrence Tynes kicked the game-winning field goal to put the Giants in Super Bowl XLVI, which they won over New England.

Game results

|-
| 
| style="| Giants  23–14
| Polo Grounds
| Giants  1–0
|
|-
| 
| style="| Giants   38–21
| Kezar Stadium
| Giants  2–0
| Giants won 1956 NFL Championship.
|-
| 
| style="| 49ers   27–17
| Yankee Stadium
| Giants  2–1
|
|-

|-
| 
| style="| Giants  21–19
| Kezar Stadium
| Giants  3–1
| Last meeting in Kezar Stadium.
|-
| 
| style="| Giants   48–14
| Yankee Stadium
| Giants  4–1
| Giants lost 1963 NFL Championship.
|-
| 
| style="| 49ers   26–10
| Yankee Stadium
| Giants  4–2
| Last meeting in Yankee Stadium.
|-

|-
| 
| style="| Giants  23–17
| Candlestick Park
| Giants  5–2
| First meeting at Candlestick Park.
|-
| 
| style="| Giants  26–23
| Candlestick Park
| Giants  6–2
|
|-
| 
| style="| Giants  20–17
| Giants Stadium
| Giants  7–2
| First meeting at Giants Stadium.
|-
| 
| style="| Giants  27–10
| Giants Stadium
| Giants  8–2
|
|-
| 
| style="| Giants  32–16
| Giants Stadium
| Giants  9–2
|
|-

|-
| 
| style="| 49ers  12–0
| Candlestick Park
| Giants  9–3
|
|-
| 
| style="| 49ers  17–10
| Candlestick Park
| Giants  9–4
|
|- 
! 1981 playoffs
! style="| 49ers   38–24
! Candlestick Park
! Giants  9–5
! NFC Divisional playoffs. First postseason meeting in the series. 49ers win Super Bowl XVI.
|-
| 
| style="| 49ers  31–10
| Giants stadium
| Giants  9–6
|
|- 
! 1984 playoffs
! style="| 49ers   21–10
! Candlestick Park
! Giants  9–7
! NFC Divisional playoffs. Second postseason meeting in the series. 49ers win Super Bowl XIX.
|- 
! 1985 playoffs
! style="| Giants   17–3
! Giants Stadium
! Giants  10–7
! NFC Wild Card playoffs. Third postseason meeting in the series. Defending champions dethroned.
|-
| 
| style="| Giants  21–17
| Candlestick Park
| Giants  11–7
|
|- 
! 1986 playoffs
! style="| Giants   49–3
! Giants Stadium
! Giants  12–7
! NFC Divisional playoffs. Fourth postseason meeting in six years. Giants win Super Bowl XXI.
|-
| 
| style="| 49ers  41–21
| Giants Stadium
| Giants  12–8
|
|-
| 
| style="| 49ers  20–17
| Giants Stadium
| Giants  12–9
| 49ers win Super Bowl XXIII.
|-
| 
| style="| 49ers  34–24
| Candlestick Park
| Giants  12–10
| 49ers win Super Bowl XXIX.
|-
|-

|-
| 
| style="| 49ers  7–3
| Candlestick Park
| Giants  12–11
|
|- 
! 1990 playoffs
! style="| Giants   15–13
! Candlestick Park
! Giants  13–11
! NFC Championship Game. Giants win Super Bowl XXV.
|-
| 
| style="| Giants  16–14
| Giants Stadium
| Giants  14–11
|
|-
| 
| style="| 49ers  31–14
| Giants Stadium
| Giants  14–12
|
|- 
! 1993 playoffs
! style="| 49ers   44–3
! Candlestick Park
! Giants  14–13
! NFC Divisional playoffs. Sixth postseason meeting. Final game in career of Phil Simms.
|-
| 
| style="| 49ers  20–6
| 3Com Park
| Tie  14–14
|
|-
| 
| style="| 49ers  31–7
| 3Com Park
| 49ers  15–14
| 49ers take their first lead in the series.
|-

|-
| 
| style="| 49ers   16–13
| Giants Stadium
| 49ers  16–14
|
|- 
! 2002 playoffs
! style="| 49ers   39–38
! 3Com Park
! 49ers  17–14
! NFC Wild Card playoffs. 49ers overcome 38–14 deficit and the Giants botch last-second game winning field goal attempt, but controversially ended without an obvious pass interference against the 49ers being called.
|-
| 
| style="| Giants   24–6
| Monster Park
| 49ers  17–15
| 
|-
| 
| style="| Giants   33–15
| Giants Stadium
| 49ers  17–16
| Giants win Super Bowl XLII.
|-
| 
| style="| Giants   29–17
| Giants Stadium
| Tie  17–17
| Final meeting at Giants Stadium.
|-

|-
| 
| style="| 49ers  27–20
| Candlestick Park
| 49ers  18–17
| 
|- 
! 2011 playoffs
! style="| Giants  20–17(OT)
! Candlestick Park
! Tie  18–18
! NFC Championship Game. Only meeting to end in overtime. Giants win Super Bowl XLVI. Last postseason meeting to date.
|-
| 
| style="| Giants  26–3
| Candlestick Park
| Giants  19–18
| Last meeting in Candlestick Park. 49ers lose Super Bowl XLVII.
|-
| 
| style="| 49ers  16–10
| MetLife Stadium
| Tie  19–19
| First meeting at MetLife Stadium.
|-
| 
| style="| Giants  30–27
| MetLife Stadium
| Giants  20–19
| 
|-
| 
| style="| 49ers  31–21
| Levi's Stadium
| Tie  20–20
| First meeting at Levi's Stadium.
|-
| 
| style="| Giants  27–23
| Levi's Stadium
| Giants  21–20
| Final start in the series for Eli Manning.
|-

|-
| 
| style="| 49ers  36–9
| MetLife Stadium
| Tie  21–21
| No fans in attendance due to COVID-19 pandemic.
|-
|
| TBD
| Levi's Stadium
|
|
|-

|-
| Regular season
| 
| Tie 8–8
| Tie 9–9
| 
|-
| Postseason
| 
| 49ers 4–2
| Giants 2–0
| NFC Wild Card playoffs: 1985, 2002. NFC Divisional playoffs: 1981, 1984, 1986, 1993. NFC Championship Game: 1990, 2011.
|-
| Regular and postseason 
| 
| 49ers 12–10
| Giants 11–9
| 
|-

See also
 Giants–Yankees rivalry, a baseball rivalry between MLB New York Yankees and San Francisco Giants clubs (the latter of whom the Giants football club was named after)

References

National Football League rivalries
San Francisco 49ers
New York Giants
New York Giants rivalries
San Francisco 49ers rivalries